Chaise longue à réglage continu, also Chaise longue modèle B 306 à réglage continu or Chaise longue B 306 (later Chaise Longue - LC4, in 1964), is a chaise longue designed by the French architect Charlotte Perriand, who was working in the offices of the Swiss-French architect Le Corbusier.

See also
 Grand Confort
 Le Corbusier's Furniture

References

1928 in art
Le Corbusier furniture
Chairs
Products introduced in 1928
Individual models of furniture